The NCUA Corporate Stabilization Program was created on January 28, 2009, in response to investment losses incurred at U.S. Central Credit Union. U.S. Central was a third-level corporate credit union that provided services to other corporate credit unions, which in turn served public-facing credit unions.

The National Credit Union Administration (NCUA) is an autonomous agency of the United States federal government, and is responsible for regulating and insuring all federally insured credit unions in the United States.

The NCUA's plan calls for all federally insured natural-person credit unions in the U.S. to pay an increased insurance premium to the National Credit Union Share Insurance Fund (NCUSIF) in 2009 to make up for the investment losses at U.S. Central, to which the NCUSIF has written a $1 billion capital note. However, NCUA has provided no assurances that the capital losses of the corporate credit unions to be covered through the planned assessment in 2009 will be adequate to cover eventual bad debt losses.

See also
National Credit Union Administration
Federal Deposit Insurance Corporation
Credit union
Credit Union National Association
Central liquidity facility
Troubled Assets Relief Program

References

External links
 Wall Street Journal U.S. moves to bail out credit unions
 Washington Post U.S. Aid goes to credit unions

Credit unions of the United States
Bank regulation in the United States
Independent agencies of the United States government
Great Recession in the United States
2009 establishments in the United States